Renán Rodríguez (1912–1999) was a Uruguayan journalist and politician who belonged to the Colorado Party. He served as Minister of Education and Culture.

References

1912 births
1999 deaths
People from San José de Mayo
Uruguayan journalists
Colorado Party (Uruguay) politicians
Education and Culture Ministers of Uruguay
Uruguayan vice-presidential candidates
Election people of Uruguay
20th-century journalists